Amanda Swope is an American politician who has served as the Oklahoma House of Representatives member from the 70th district since November 16, 2022. She was the Tulsa County Democratic Party Chairwoman between 2019 and 2022, the youngest person and first Native American to hold the position. She is a citizen of the Muscogee Nation.

Early life and education
Amanda Swope was born and raised in Tulsa where she graduated from Nathan Hale High School in 2006. She earned her bachelor's degree in psychology from Northeastern State University and her master's degree in public administration from the University of Oklahoma.

Career
Swope worked in the nonprofit sector before accepting a job for the Muscogee Nation in 2018. She became the tribal juvenile justice program director for the Muscogee Nation in 2021.

Tulsa County Democratic Party
Swope started volunteering with the Tulsa County Democratic Party in 2011. She served as the Chairwoman of the Tulsa County Democratic Party from 2019 to 2022. She was the first woman and first Native American to hold the seat.

Oklahoma House of Representatives
Swope filed to run for Oklahoma House of Representatives 71st district to succeed Representative Denise Brewer in 2022. She faced no other Democratic candidates in the primary and Republican Mike Masters in the general election. She was endorsed by the Tulsa World and received campaign contributions from the Cherokee Nation. She defeated Masters with over 60% of the vote. She was sworn in on November 16, 2022.

Personal life
Swope is a citizen of the Muscogee Nation.

References

21st-century American politicians
Democratic Party members of the Oklahoma House of Representatives
Muscogee (Creek) Nation state legislators in Oklahoma
Northeastern State University alumni
Politicians from Tulsa, Oklahoma
Tulsa Public Schools alumni
University of Oklahoma alumni
Women state legislators in Oklahoma
Year of birth missing (living people)
21st-century American women politicians
Living people